The Catalunya Championship was a professional golf tournament that was held 28 April – 1 May 2022 at the PGA Catalunya Resort in Girona, Spain.

The tournament was created as a one-off event after the Volvo China Open; originally scheduled to take place the same week was postponed. It will be played the week after the ISPS Handa Championship in Spain; another one-off event created for the 2022 schedule.

Adri Arnaus won the event by shooting a final-round 65 to tie Oliver Bekker at 11 under-par. Arnaus defeated Bekker in a six hole sudden-death playoff.

Winners

References

External links
Event page on the official site of the European Tour

Former European Tour events
Golf tournaments in Spain
Sport in Tarragona
2022 establishments in Spain